Demo 2002 was the first release by the Norwegian black metal band Orcustus, founded by Taipan and with Infernus and Tormentor of Gorgoroth and Dirge Rep of Enslaved and Gehenna. It was limited to 1,000 copies on CD. This demo led to the band being signed to the US record label Southern Lord Records.

It was re-released by Misantrof ANTIrecords in 2007 as downloadable mp3s.

Track listing
All music written by Taipan, except one riff on track 2 by Tormentor. Lyrics by Taipan (track 1), A.B. (track 2) and Dirge Rep (track 3).
"Death Becomes You" - 4:15
"World Dirtnap" - 5:41
"Lucifuge Damnation" - 6:04

Credits
Tormentor - guitars
Infernus - bass guitar
Dirge Rep - drums
Taipan - vocals

Recorded at Strangehagen Dungeons in Bergen, Norway, in October and November 2002
Produced by Orcustus and by Ivar Peersen of Enslaved
Mastered by Alex 'Evil Tordivel'
Logo design by Jannicke Wiese-Hansen
Cover design by Taipan and Tormentor.

References

External links
Demo 2002 at Misantrof Antirecords

Orcustus albums
2003 EPs
Demo albums